Fedor Georgievich Alekseev is a Russian and Armenian linguist and journalist of Belarusian origin.
 
He is the editor-in-chief of Minority Languages, a Russian academic journal dedicated to endangered languages of Russia, and Kamysh, a local online magazine based in the city of Astrakhan in Southern Russia.

Selected works 
 2010. Tok Pisin. Great books will be written one day (in Russian).
 2015. Loan word adaptation in Gilbertese.
 2016. Field research on the Seto language (in Russian).
 2017. Bulgar Tatars of Astrakhan and their language (in Russian).

Notes 

Living people
Linguists from Russia
Russian journalists
Year of birth missing (living people)